Julie Keeble (born 18 April 1975) is a Welsh former competitive ice dancer who represented the United Kingdom. With Łukasz Zalewski, she is the 1999 Karl Schäfer Memorial champion, 1999 Skate Israel bronze medalist, and 2000 British national champion. During her career with Zalewski and Lasantha Salapadru, Keeble competed in the final segment at three ISU Championships.

Personal life 
Keeble was born on 18 April 1975 in Cardiff, Wales. During her skating career, she worked as a bookkeeper.

Career 
Keeble competed with Lasantha Salapadru on the junior level. They finished 12th at the 1994 World Junior Championships, held in late 1993 in Colorado Springs, Colorado, United States.

In 1998, Keeble was partnered with Poland's Łukasz Zalewski by their coach, Garry Alan Hoppe, in London, England. The duo competed on the senior level, representing the United Kingdom internationally. In the 1998–1999 season, they placed fourth at the British Championships, a few weeks after beginning their partnership.

The following season, Keeble/Zalewski won gold at the 1999 Karl Schäfer Memorial in October, gold at the British Championships in November, and bronze at the 1999 Skate Israel in December. In February, the duo finished 16th at the 2000 European Championships, held in Vienna, Austria. In March, they qualified to the free dance at the 2000 World Championships in Nice, France; they ranked 23rd in the original dance, 21st in the free dance, and 21st overall.

Keeble and Zalewski decided to retire from competition in August 2000.

Programs 
(with Zalewski)

Competitive highlights

With Zalewski

With Salapadru

References 

1975 births
British female ice dancers
Living people
Sportspeople from Cardiff
Welsh ice dancers